Mykhailo Borysovych Radutskyi (born 5 December 1968, Kyiv) in a Ukrainian entrepreneur, social activist, People's Deputy of Ukraine of the IVth convocation.

Biography
Studied at P.I. Gavros Kyiv Medical College, where qualified as an Emergency Medical Technician and at The National University of Ukraine on Physical Education and Sport on speciality ‘Olympic and professional sport’, where he received a master's degree in Olympic and professional sport. In 1987 worked as an EMT on Kyiv ambulance station. In 1989-1993 held the position of deputy director of ‘Kyivconcert’. In 1993 started medical business. In 1994-2004 – commercial director, deputy director of LLC ‘Boris’, from 2004 – the president of LLC ‘Boris’. From 2015 – advisor to the head of Kyiv City State Administration Vitali Klitschko.
In the past – member of the Higher Medical Council of the Ministry of Healthcare of Ukraine. Candidate for people's deputies from the political party ‘Servant of the People’ in 2019 parliamentary elections, No. 18 on the list. Non-party.
On 30 July 2019 president Volodymyr Zelensky appointed Radutskyi his advisor (our of state).
In 2019 was elected a People's Deputy of Ukraine of the IXth convocation in the 2019 Ukrainian parliamentary election as number 18 of the party list of the Servant of the People party. (Although he was not a member of any party.)
Faction: Member of the Servant of the People parliamentary faction.
Post: Chairperson of the Verkhovna Rada (Ukraine's national parliament) Committee on Public Health, Medical Assistance and Medical Insurance.
Member of the Ukrainian part of interparliamentary assembly of the parliament of Georgia, parliament of the Republic of Moldova and the Verkhovna Rada of Ukraine. Deputy member of the Ukrainian part of the Parliamentary Committee of the Ukrainian part of the Parliamentary Association Committee. Head of a group for inter-parliamentary relations with the Kingdom of Thailand. Head of a group for inter-parliamentary relations with the Republic of Moldova. 
Member of a group for inter-parliamentary relations with the Italian Republic. Member of a group for inter-parliamentary relations with the Republic of Kazakhstan. Member of a group for inter-parliamentary relations with the Republic of Armenia. Member of a group for inter-parliamentary relations with the French Republic. Member of a group for inter-parliamentary relations with the Republic of Croatia.

On 31 August 2019, Servant of the People faction leader Davyd Arakhamia stated on  that most likely Minister of Healthcare in the Honcharuk Government Zoriana Skaletska would be replaced by Radutskyi (who according to Arakhamia needed "about three months to prepare" for the post). This did not materialise and on 4 March 2020 the Honcharuk Government was replaced by the Shmyhal Government in which Illia Yemets replaced Skaletska as Minister of Healthcare.

References 

1968 births
Living people
Politicians from Kyiv
National University of Ukraine on Physical Education and Sport alumni
Ukrainian People's Party politicians
Ninth convocation members of the Verkhovna Rada
Servant of the People (political party) politicians
21st-century Ukrainian businesspeople
21st-century Ukrainian politicians